WMRY is a Public Radio formatted broadcast radio station licensed to Crozet, Virginia, serving the Independent City of Charlottesville along with Albemarle and Nelson counties in Virginia.  WMRY is owned and operated by James Madison University. WMRY rebroadcasts sister station WMRA full-time.

References

External links
 WMRA Online
 

1995 establishments in Virginia
Public radio stations in the United States
NPR member stations
Radio stations established in 1995
MRY
MRY
James Madison University
Albemarle County, Virginia